Zheng Zhiyun may refer to:

 Megan Zheng (born 1993), Singaporean actress & novelist
 Zheng Zhiyun (footballer) (born 1995), Chinese footballer